Madascincus minutus is an extant species of skink, a lizard in the family Scincidae. The species is endemic to Madagascar.

References

Madascincus
Reptiles described in 1993
Reptiles of Madagascar
Endemic fauna of Madagascar
Taxa named by Christopher John Raxworthy
Taxa named by Ronald Archie Nussbaum